The 2001–02 Cupa României was the 64th edition of Romania's most prestigious football cup competition.

The title was won by Rapid București against Dinamo București.

Format
The competition is an annual knockout tournament.

First round proper matches are played on the ground of the lowest ranked team, then from the second round proper the matches are played on a neutral location.

If a match is drawn after 90 minutes, the game goes into extra time, where it works golden goal rule. If the match is still tied, the result is decided by penalty kicks.

In the semi-finals, each tie is played as a two legs.

From the first edition, the teams from Divizia A entered in competition in sixteen finals, rule which remained till today.

First round proper

|colspan=3 style="background-color:#97DEFF;"|10 October 2001

|}

Second round proper

|colspan=3 style="background-color:#97DEFF;"|31 October 2001

|}

Quarter-finals 

|colspan=3 style="background-color:#97DEFF;"|3 April 2002

|}

Semi-finals
The matches were played on 24 April and 8 May 2002.

||2–2||0–0
||0–1||1–3
|}

Final

References

External links
 romaniansoccer.ro
 Official site
 The Romanian Cup on the FRF's official site

Cupa României seasons
2001–02 in Romanian football
Romania